The men's 200 metres at the 2003 All-Africa Games were held on October 13–14.

Medalists

Results

Heats
Qualification: First 4 of each heat (Q) and the next 4 fastest (q) qualified for the semifinals.

Wind:Heat 1: 0.0 m/s, Heat 2: -0.8 m/s, Heat 3: -1.4 m/s, Heat 4: 0.0 m/s, Heat 5: -0.4 m/s

Semifinals
Qualification: First 2 of each semifinal (Q) and the next 2 fastest (q) qualified for the final.

Wind:Heat 1: +1.1 m/s, Heat 2: 0.0 m/s, Heat 3: +0.6 m/s

Final
Wind: -0.9 m/s

References
Results
Results

200